Hugh Francis Redmond (October 30, 1919 - April 13, 1970) was an American World War II paratrooper who later worked for the CIA in their storied Special Activities Division.  He was in Shanghai disguised as an ice cream machine salesman from 1946 to 1951, returning intelligence information on the Chinese Communist Party.

As he was boarding a ship to San Francisco to return to the United States, he was captured and imprisoned. Held for almost twenty years in a prison camp, he was severely tortured, but never admitted his connection to the CIA.

In 1970, he died; the Chinese claim he slit his wrists on April 13, 1970.  The Chinese cremated his remains and they were returned to the United States. Redmond was buried in Yonker's Oakland Cemetery on August 3, 1970.  Considerable mystery still surrounds whether or not he was murdered during his imprisonment.

References

People of the Central Intelligence Agency
1970 suicides
American spies
United States Army soldiers
United States Army personnel of World War II
People from Yonkers, New York
Prisoners and detainees of the People's Republic of China
Spies who died in prison custody
American people imprisoned abroad
American people who died in prison custody
Prisoners who died in Chinese detention
American people convicted of spying for the United States
1919 births
1970 deaths
American torture victims